The Unbelievable Gwenpool, more commonly called Unbelievable Gwenpool, is a manga-influenced superhero comic book series published by Marvel Comics, featuring Gwenpool as its main protagonist. The series was a spin-off from the character's feature in a Howard the Duck comic, and was Gwenpool's first solo series. The series lasted 26 issues, #1–25 and a special #0 that collected her intro material. The series ran from June 2016 to April 2018.

Publication history 
Gwenpool's first appearance was on a variant cover for Deadpool's Secret Secret Wars, and the character became a surprising hit among fans despite not appearing in an actual comic. After receiving a holiday special one-shot and appearing as a secondary character in a Howard the Duck story, Marvel announced the release of Unbelievable Gwenpool in December 2015, retaining the core creative team of Christopher Hastings and Gurihiru who had developed the Gwenpool holiday one-shot. The series debuted in June 2016, and released a special #0 issue along with Unbelievable Gwenpool #2 that collected the character's Christmas and Howard the Duck adventures.

Reception 
According to comic book review aggregator Comic Book Roundup, Unbelievable Gwenpool has an average review score of 8 out of 10, indicating generally favorable reviews. Critics generally praised Hastings' writing (noting that he did not bog down the character in origin stories), and especially the art from Gurihiru, but criticized the series for being a "cynical cashgrab" and for "cringe-worthy" dialogue and pacing issues near the end of the series' run.

Kinja's Observation Deck wrote favorably of the last issue, where Gwenpool converses with other characters outside the fabric of reality in an effort to understand her actions, saying that the series finale demonstrated the "incredible power of comic books."

According to trade publication ICv2, the first issue of Unbelievable Gwenpool was the 6th best-selling comic for April 2016, selling 100,852 units.

Accolades 
Unbelievable Gwenpool won second place in the 2018 Gaiman Awards for the first two volumes of Unbelievable Gwenpool.

Collected editions 
 Unbelievable Gwenpool Vol. 1: Believe It [#0-4]
 Unbelievable Gwenpool Vol. 2: Head of Modok [#5-10]
 Unbelievable Gwenpool Vol. 3: Totally in Continuity [#11-15] )
  Unbelievable Gwenpool Vol. 4: Beyond The Fourth Wall [#16-20]
  Unbelievable Gwenpool Vol. 5: Lost In The Plot [#21-25]

In other media
Hulu aired a M.O.D.O.K. animated series, featuring the Mercenary Organization Dedicated Only to Killing introduced in The Unbelievable Gwenpool, with MODOK voiced by Patton Oswalt, who also co-wrote and executive produced the series with Jordan Blum.

In 2021 Marvel Cinematic Universe (MCU) film Spider-Man: No Way Home, the initial spell Peter Parker attempts to have Doctor Strange cast to make the world forget he is Spider-Man, and the spell he ultimately later has Strange cast alongside the barriers of the multiverse to make his existence completely forgotten to the entire world, are respectively adapted from The Amazing Spider-Man storyline "One Moment in Time" and the Unbelievable Gwenpool storyline "Believe It", introduced as a spell Gwen has Strange cast to make her original world forget her existence; Strange additionally compliments Benedict Cumberbatch's portrayal of him in the original storyline.

References

External links 
 Unbelievable Gwenpool at the Marvel Database

Superhero comics
Comedy comics
2016 comics debuts
Marvel Comics titles
Isekai comics
Original English-language manga